Iswahjudi Air Force Base, Iswahjudi Airport or Iswahjudi Airbase is an airbase operated by the Indonesian Air Force. It is the main base of several squadrons of Indonesian jet fighters, including:

Skadron Udara 3 "Sarang Naga" (Dragon's Nest), equipped with F-16AM/BM (previously F-16A/B Block 15 OCU)
Skadron Udara 14 "The Eagles", equipped with F-16C/D Block 52ID (previously F-5E/F-5F and Sukhoi Su-27/30 as a stopgap)
Skadron Udara 15 "The Typhoons", equipped with KAI T-50i Golden Eagle (previously Hawk 53)

The airbase is located at Maospati, Magetan, near the city of Madiun on the west side of East Javan capital Surabaya. It is named after Iswahjudi, an Indonesian air force officer who, together with Halim Perdanakusuma, was killed in an air crash while returning to Indonesia from Thailand in 1947.

Currently, the airport is not used for civilian flights.

Geographic 
This airbase is located at coordinates 111° 26'02.82" east longitude and 07° 36' 56.76" south latitude, Maospati District, Magetan Regency, East Java. Maospati is located at a fork in the highway that connects Madiun City, Magetan Regency and Ngawi Regency. In the west there is Mount Lawu with a height of 10,712 feet; in the east there is the Mount Wilis with a peak of 8,400 feet; in the south it stretches the land of the mountains to the South Sea; and in the north is a wide lowland.

History

Dutch East Indies 

In 1890, in Batavia and Aceh, flights using "ballonvaarten" balloons were successfully carreid out. This is the first experiment conducted by Koninklijk Nederlandsch-Indische Leger (KNIL) in aerospace. and then the Dutch East Indies government began to develop it. In February 1913, a test flight was conducted in Surabaya with an airplane transported from the Netherlands by ship. And when World War I broke out, it became increasingly necessary to build up the strength of the Air Force.

On May 30, 1914, the Royal Netherlands Air Force embryo was established under the name Proefvliegafdeling (PVA) or the Flight Test Department. Then on March 31, 1939, the Royal Netherlands East Indies Army Air Force or better known as Militaire Luchtvaart (ML) was established in Kalijati, Subang, West Java. And also established Marine Luchtvaart Dienst (MLD) in Surabaya. Both of them only prioritized training Dutch soldiers.

Around 1939, the Dutch began to build the Maospati Air Base (PAU Maospati), with a size of 1,586 X 53 meters, and is located at an altitude of 120 meters above sea level. This base was built as part of the preparation of the Dutch Van Ooorlog department (Ministry of War - Netherlands) to deal with Japanese air attacks, so that it could immediately accommodate Militaire Luchtvaart aircraft.

The construction of this air base required a large area of land, so there was a forced displacement of the population from the following villages:

 Ngujung Village, Maospati, Magetan, completely relocated
 Setren Village, some of the rice fields have been moved
 Kleco Village, some of the rice fields have been moved
 Lemahbang Village, completely relocated
 Kinandang Village, completely relocated
 Kincang Kulon Village, completely relocated
 Pandeyan village, residents of the village in the southern part were moved, and moved to the area that is now the village of Bogorejo, West, Magetan
 Mranggen Village, the villagers in the southern part were moved

Residents who have received compensation money have moved voluntarily, and there are several villages that have moved entirely (bedol desa). Like the residents of Pandeyan village, they moved to the north of the main road and occupied the village of Bogorejo and village of Ronowijayan to become the village of Sukolilo. After the residents moved, the construction of the air base began in 1939. The runway was the first thing built. Then proceed with the construction of three hangars in the Klecorejo, Setren and Ngujung areas. Then, they built a workshop building (now the 042 Engineering Squadron hangar), a montage building near the workshop, four warehouses, a workshop and others. The development was continued by building offices, military dormitories (campement) for Dutch soldiers and their families.

Construction of the Maospati PAU was completed at the end of May 1940. The base was officially opened with the deployment of three air squadrons:

 One fighter squadron, 13 Curtiss 75A-7 Hawks, since 1 February 1941
 Two squadrons of fighter, 17 Curtiss Wright 21B Interceptor aircraft, since late 1941
 One training squadron, with a capacity of 6 Brewster F2A Buffalo aircraft

A total of 36 aircraft were divided into the three air squadrons.

Japanese occupation 
When the Pacific war broke out in 1941, this air base was used as a base for Allied troops on the island of Java. When the Dutch surrendered to the Japanese in 1942, the Imperial Japanese Navy (Kaigun Kokusho) took control of this air base. Around the base are stationed base defense troops from Rikugun (Army battalion).

In the event of the attack on the base by the Japanese, the base commander was Captain H.J. Van De Pool, who eventually died in aerial combat. Due to its short occupation and busyness in the Pacific War, Japan did not have the opportunity to build this air base.

This base, at that time, was used to store various types of Japanese-made aircraft motor parts.

Post-Independence 

After Indonesia's independence, the Maospati Air Base was controlled by the soldiers of the struggle at that time. On 27 August 1945, this airbase was handed over by the commander of Dai Nippon in Maospati to Wedono Maospati. The BKO TKR (People's Security Army Aircraft Workshop) Maospati was handed over from the Madiun TKR Regiment Commander to MB AURI (Air Force Headquarters) on May 5, 1946, and since then officially belongs to the Air Force and is referred to as the National Air Base. Prof. Dr. Abdul Rahman Saleh was appointed as the base commander as well as the commander of the Bugis base, Malang. His representative is H. Soejono who also comes from the same base.

Independence struggle I 
During this period, this airbase was badly damaged by attacks by Dutch warplanes and almost all other airbases in Java except for the Maguwo Air Base and the MB AURI in Yogyakarta because it was protected by bad weather.

Based on the Decree of the Minister/Commander of the Air Force Number 564 dated November 4, 1960, the "Maospati Air Base" changed its name to "Iswahjudi Air Force Base". With the development of the role of Iswahjudi Air Base in the struggle for Irian Jaya, it became the Main Air Base (Lanuma). Currently, the Indonesian Air Force Base Iswahjudi is a Type A air base and is under the Air Operations Command II.

Units under Iswahjudi Airbase control 
The units within the Iswahjudi Airbase include:

  3rd Air Wing (Combat)

  3rd Air Squadron
  14th Air Squadron
  15th Air Squadron

  042 Engineering Squadron
 dr. Efram Harsana Air Force Hospital
  Iswahjudi Air Base Air Force Military Police Unit 
 Iswahjudi Air Base Defense Unit

 Air Weapon Range (AWR) Pulung, Ponorogo

References

Indonesian Air Force bases
Airports in East Java